The Manx runestones were made by the Norse population on the Isle of Man during the Viking Age, mostly in the 10th century. Despite its small size, the Isle of Man stands out with many Viking Age runestones, in 1983 numbering as many as 26 surviving stones, which can be compared to 33 in all of Norway. So many of them may appear on the Isle of Man because of the merging of the immigrant Norse runestone tradition with the local Celtic tradition of raising high crosses.

In addition, the church contributed by not condemning the runes as pagan, but instead it encouraged the recording of people for Christian purposes. Sixteen of the stones bear the common formula, "N ... put up this cross in memory of M", but among the other ten there is also a stone raised for the benefit of the runestone raiser.

The Manx runestones are consequently similar to the Scandinavian ones, but whereas a Norwegian runestone is called "stone" in the inscriptions, even if it is in the shape of a cross, the runestones that were raised in the British isles are typically called "crosses". There are also two slabs incised with Anglo-Saxon runes at Maughold.

Andreas parish

Br Olsen;183 (Andreas (I), MM 99)

This runestone is a stone cross that is located in the church Andreas. The inscription is in short-twig runes and it commemorates a father.

Latin transliteration:

 ... (þ)[an](a) : [aft] (u)(f)(a)ik : fauþur : sin : in : kautr : kar[þ]i : sunr : biarnar f(r)(a) : (k)(u)(l)(i) [:]

Old Norse transliteration:

 ... þenna ept Ófeig, fǫður sinn, en Gautr gerði, sonr Bjarnar frá Kolli.

English translation:

 "... this [cross] in memory of Ófeigr, his father, but Gautr made (it), the son of Bjǫrn from Kollr."

Br Olsen;184 (Andreas (II), MM 131)

This stone cross is located in the church Andreas. It is engraved with short-twig runes, and it is dated to c. 940. It was erected in memory of a wife.

Latin transliteration:

 sont:ulf : hin : suarti : raisti : krus : þona : aftir : arin:biaurk * kuinu : sina (u) [*] k : au [*]: (o)ks/(b)ks

Old Norse transliteration:

 Sandulfr hinn Svarti reisti kross þenna eptir Arinbjǫrgu, konu sína. ... ... ... ...

English translation:

 "Sandulfr the Black erected this cross in memory of Arinbjǫrg his wife. ..."

Thorwald's Cross: Br Olsen;185A (Andreas (III), MM 128)

Referred to as Thorwald's Cross, this stone cross is found in the church Andreas. Only attribution to the one who raised the stone—Þorvaldr—remains of the message inscribed on the cross. It has been badly damaged since it was recorded. The stone depicts a bearded human holding a spear downward at a wolf, his right foot in its mouth, while a large bird sits at his shoulder. Rundata dates it to 940, while Pluskowski dates it to the 11th century.

This depiction has been interpreted as the Norse pagan god Odin, with a raven or eagle at his shoulder, being consumed by the wolf Fenrir during the events of Ragnarök. Next to the image is a depiction of a large cross and another image parallel to it that has been described as Christ triumphing over Satan. These combined elements have led to the cross as being described as "syncretic art"; a mixture of pagan and Christian beliefs. Andy Orchard comments that the bird on Odin's shoulder may be either Huginn or Muninn, Odin's ravens.

Latin transliteration:

 þurualtr ÷ (r)[aisti] (k)(r)(u)(s) ÷ (þ)[...]

Old Norse transliteration:

 Þorvaldr reisti kross þe[nna].

English translation:

 "Þorvaldr raised (this) cross."

Br Olsen;185B (Andreas (IV), MM 113)
This stone cross is located in the church Andreas. It is engraved with short-twig runes and it is dated to the 10th century. What remains of the message informs that it was raised in memory of someone.

Latin transliteration:

 [... ...ai]s[t]i : [k]rus : þaina : aftiʀ ...

Old Norse transliteration:

 ... reisti kross þenna eptir ...

English translation:

 "... raised this cross in memory of ..."

Br Olsen;185C (Andreas (V), MM 111)

Only fragments remain of this stone cross, and they are located in the church Andreas. The inscription has not been deciphered, but it is of note as it consists of unusual twig runes and bind runes.

Latin transliteration:

 ...

Old Norse transliteration:

 ...

English translation:

 "..."

Br Page1998;9 (Andreas (VI), MM 121)
Only a fragment remains of this slab of stone that was once part of a grave. It is dated to the Viking Age and it is located in the church Andreas. Too little remains of the inscription to allow any decipherment.

Latin transliteration:

 ka-

Old Norse transliteration:

 ...

English translation:

 "..."

Br NOR1992;6B (Andreas (VII), MM 193)
This fragment was discovered at Larivane Cottage it is a slab of stone was once part of a grave. The inscription was made in relief form, and it is located in the Manx Museum. What remains of the inscription cannot be read.

Latin transliteration:

 ...----...

Old Norse transliteration:

 ...

English translation:

 "..."

Ballaugh parish

Br Olsen;189 (Ballaugh, MM 106)

This stone cross is located in Ballaugh. The inscription consists of short-twig runes and they are dated to the second half of the 10th century. It was raised in memory of a son.

Latin transliteration:

 oulaibr ÷ liu(t)ulbs| |sunr : r[ai](s)[ti k]rs * þ-na : ai(f)(t)ir * ...-b : sun [s]in

Old Norse transliteration:

 Áleifr/Óleifr Ljótulfs sonr reisti kross þ[e]nna eptir [Ul]f, son sinn.

English translation:

 "Áleifr/Óleifr, Ljótulfrs son raised this cross in memory of Ulfr, his son."

Lezayre parish

Br Olsen;190A (Balleigh)
These fragments of a stone cross are found at Balleigh, and they are dated to the Viking Age. Only traces of runes remain and they cannot be read.

Latin transliteration:

 ...

Old Norse transliteration:

 ...

English translation:

 "..."

Braddan parish

Br Olsen;190B (Braddan (I), MM 112)
This stone cross is located in the church Braddan. The inscription consists of short-twig runes and they are dated to 930–950. It was raised in memory of a man.

Latin transliteration:

 (þ)(u)(r)... : raisti : krus : þono : ift : ufaak : sun : krinais

Old Norse transliteration:

 Þorsteinn reisti kross þenna ept Ófeig, son Krínáns.

English translation:

 "Þorsteinn raised this cross in memory of Ófeigr, the son of Krínán."

Br Olsen;191A (Braddan (II), MM 138)

This stone cross is found in the church Braddan. The inscription consists of short-twig runes and it is dated to the second half of the 10th century. It reports betrayal.

Latin transliteration:

 ... ...(n) roskitil : uilti : i : triku : aiþsoara : siin

Old Norse transliteration:

 ... [e]n Hrossketill vélti í tryggu eiðsvara sinn.

English translation:

 "... but Hrosketill betrayed the faith of his sworn confederate."

Br Olsen;191B (Braddan (III), MM 136)

This stone cross is found in the church Braddan. The inscription consists of short-twig runes and it is dated to the 980s. The runemaster is identified as man named Thorbjörn, who also made Br Olsen;193A, below. It has been badly damaged since it was recorded.

Latin transliteration:

 utr : risti : krus : þono : aft : fro(k)(a) [: f](a)(þ)[ur sin : in :] (þ)[urbiaurn : ...]

Old Norse transliteration:

 Oddr reisti kross þenna ept Frakka, fǫður sinn, en Þorbjǫrn ...

English translation:

 "Oddr raised this cross in memory of Frakki, his father, but ... ..."

Br Olsen;193A (Braddan (IV), MM 135)

This runestone which is dated to the 980s is found in the church Braddan. The inscription consists of short-twig runes and they were made by the runemaster Thorbjörn, like Br Olsen;191B, above. It was made in memory of a son.

Latin transliteration:

 þurlibr : nhaki : risti : krus : þono : aft [:] fiak : s(u)[n] (s)in : (b)ruþur:sun : habrs × {IHSVS}

Old Norse transliteration:

 Þorleifr Hnakki reisti kross þenna ept Fiak, son sinn, bróðurson Hafrs. {ihsvs>}

English translation:

 "Þorleifr the Neck raised this cross in memory of Fiak, his son, Hafr's brothers son. ihsvs"

Br Page1998;20 (Braddan (V), MM 176)
This fragment of a runestone is located in Manx Museum. It is probably from the Viking Age, but as of 2006, it had not yet been analysed.

Latin transliteration:

 ...

Old Norse transliteration:

 ...

English translation:

 "..."

Br NOR1992;6A (Braddan (VI), MM 200)
This runestone consists of a fragment of slate. It is dated to the Viking Age and it is located in Manx Museum. The only message that remains consists of "made".

Latin transliteration:

 ...---r—nr * kirþi * ...

Old Norse transliteration:

 ... gerði ...

English translation:

 "... made ..."

 gerði  would also translate into modern Swedish as  gjorde or English did ... The meaning of the words made or did depends on the original context of the sentence as a whole (or at least the words surrounding this single word), which here appears lost.

The current use of the Swedish word gjorde is much more closely related to did than the word made. Which is intended is impossible to say here.

Bride parish

Br Olsen;193B (MM 118)
This stone cross is found in the church Bride. The inscription consists of short-twig runes and it is dated to between 930 and 950. It was raised in memory of a wife.

Latin transliteration:

 [t]ruian : sur [t]u(f)kals : raisti krs þina : a(f)[t] aþmiu... : kunu si[n...]

Old Norse transliteration:

 Druian, sonr Dufgals, reisti kross þenna ept Aþmiu[l], konu sín[a].

English translation:

 "Druian, Dufgal's son raised this cross in memory of Aþmiu[l], his wife."

Onchan parish

Br Olsen;194 (MM 141)

This runestone consists of a short-twig runic inscription on an old Irish stone cross. The inscriptions A, B and C date from the Viking Age, while D is later. A and B were made by the same scribe, C and D were made by a second and a third one, while a fourth scribe made E, F and G.

Latin transliteration:

 A ...(a) sunr × raisti × if(t) [k](u)[i](n)(u) (s)(i)(n)(a) ×
 B murkialu × m...
 C × uk ik at × auk raþ ik r...t ×
 D a=læns
 E kru...
 F isu krist
 G þuriþ × raist × rune... ×

Old Norse transliteration:

 A ... sonr reisti ept konu sína
 B Myrgjǫl ...
 C Hygg ek at ok ræð ek r[é]tt.
 D Alleins.
 E Kro[ss]
 F Jésu Krist
 G Þúríð reist rúna[r].

English translation:

 A "...'s son raised (this) in memory of his wife"
 B "Myrgjǫl ..."
 C "I examine (the runes) and I interpret (them) rightly.(?)"
 D "in agreement(?)"
 E "Cross"
 F "Jesus Christ"
 G "Þúríð carved the runes."

German parish

Br Olsen;199 (German (I), MM 107)

This stone cross is located in the chapel of Saint John. The inscription is in short-twig runes and it is dated to between 930 and 950. The inscription is secondary and it is poorly preserved. Only a few main staffs are visible.

Latin transliteration:

 ... in o(s)(r)(u)(þ)(r) : raist : runar : þsar × ¶ ----- -

Old Norse transliteration:

 ... En Ásrøðr reist rúnar þessar. ... ...

English translation:

 "... and Ásrøðr carved these runes. ... ..."

Br Olsen;200A (German (II), MM 140)

This stone cross is found in Manx Museum. The inscription is in short-twig runes, but it may be later than the Viking Age. It was inscribed in memory of a wife.

Latin transliteration:

 ... ... ...(u)s * þense * efter * asriþi * kunu sina * (t)(u)(t)ur * ut... ...-

Old Norse transliteration:

 ... ... [kr]oss þenna eptir Ástríði, konu sína, dóttur Odd[s]. ...

English translation:

 "... ... this cross in memory of Ástríðr, his wife, Oddr's daughter ..."

Jurby parish

Br Olsen;200B (MM 127)

This stone cross is found in Jurby and the short-twig runes are dated to the second half of the 10th century. It has been badly damaged since it was recorded. One of the figures depicted on the cross holds a small sword in his right hand and an Alpine horn in his left while a raven flies overhead. It has been suggested that this figure represents the Norse pagan deity Heimdall holding the Gjallarhorn, used to announce the coming of Ragnarök.

Latin transliteration:

 [... ... ...un * si]n : in : onon : raiti ¶ --- * aftir þurb-...

Old Norse transliteration:

 ... ... [s]on sinn, en annan reisti/rétti [hann](?) eptir Þor...

English translation:

 "... ... his son and raised(?) another ... in memory of Þorb-..."

Marown parish

Br Olsen;201 (MM 139)
This stone cross is located in Saint Trinian's chapel. The short-twig inscription is dated to the Viking Age.

Latin transliteration:

 þurbiaurn : risti : krus : þ(o)-...

Old Norse transliteration:

 Þorbjǫrn reisti kross þe[nna].

English translation:

 "Þorbjǫrn raised this cross."

Maughold parish

Br Olsen;202A (Maughold (I), MM 145)
This runic inscription is found on a stone slab that was used in a grave. It is located near the church Maughold. The inscription is dated to the second half of the 12th century, and it was made by the same runemaster as Br Olsen;202B. On the stone can also be seen the first half of the Ogham alphabet.

Latin transliteration:

 (i)(u)an + brist + raisti + þasir + runur +¶ [f]uþor(k)(h)niastbml +

Old Norse transliteration:

 Jóan prestr reisti þessar rúnar. 

English translation:

 "Jóan the priest carved these runes.  Fuþorkhniastbml"

Br Olsen;202B (Maughold (II), MM 144)
This inscription is found on a slab of stone that was used in a grave. It was discovered at the upper end of the Corna valley, but is now at the church Maughold. The short-twig inscription is dated to the second half of the 12th century and it was made by the same runemaster as Br Olsen;202A.

Latin transliteration:

 + krisþ : malaki : ok baþr(i)k : (a)þ(a)(n)man (×) ¶ ÷ [...nal] * sauþ * a... * iuan * brist * i kurnaþal *

Old Norse transliteration:

 Kristr, Malaki ok Patrik. Adamnán ... ... ... Jóan prestr í Kornadal.

English translation:

 "Christ, Malachi, and Patrick. Adamnán ... Joán the priest in Kornadalr."

Br Olsen;205A (Maughold (III), MM 133)
This fragment of a stone cross was found in Ballagilley. It is now located at the church Maughold. It is dated to the Viking Age but only four runes remain of the inscription.

Latin transliteration:

 ...

Old Norse transliteration:

 ...

English translation:

 "..."

Br Olsen;205B (Maughold (IV), MM 142)

This inscription is dated to c. 1000 and found on a slab of stone that was used in a grave, and it is located at the church Maughold. The inscription is in long-branch runes, except for the s rune, and there is reason to believe that it was made by a visitor to the Isle of Man.

Latin transliteration:

 A heþin : seti : krus : þino : eftir : tutur : sino ¶ lif... ¶ lifilt
 B arni : risti : runar : þisar
 C sikuþr

Old Norse transliteration:

 A Heðinn setti kross þenna eptir dóttur sína Hlíf[hildi]. Hlífhildi.
 B Árni risti rúnar þessar.
 C Sigurðr.

English translation:

 A "Heðinn placed this cross in memory of his daughter Hlíf(hildr). Hlífhildr."
B "Árni carved these runes."
C "Sigurðr."

Br Page1998;21 (Maughold (V), MM 175)
This inscription is found on a slab of stone that was used in a grave. It is located in the Manx Museum. It is in short-twig runes and it is dated to the Viking Age. It was engraved in memory of a wife.

Latin transliteration:

 kuan sunr × mailb—ak... + kirþi + lik+tinn i(f)tir + ¶ + kuina sina +

Old Norse transliteration:

 , sonr  gerði líkstein(?) eptir kona sína.

English translation:

 ", son of  made the tomb-stone(?) in memory of his wife."

Michael parish

Br Olsen;208A (Kirk Michael (I), MM 102)

This fragment of a stone cross is located in the church Kirk Michael. The inscription in short-twig runes is dated to the Viking Age.

Latin transliteration:

 ... [kru](s) : þna : af[tir : ...]

Old Norse transliteration:

 ... kross þenna eptir ...

English translation:

 "... this cross in memory of ..."

Br Olsen;208B (Kirk Michael (II), MM 101)

This stone cross is located in the church Kirk Michael, and it is dated to the Viking Age. The inscription is in short-twig runes and it was dedicated to a man while he was alive.

Latin transliteration:

 × mail:brikti : sunr : aþakans : smiþ : raisti : krus : þano : fur :¶ salu : sina : sin:bruku in : kaut ×¶ kirþi : þano : auk ¶ ala : i maun ×

Old Norse transliteration:

 Melbrigði, sonr Aðakáns Smiðs, reisti kross þenna fyr sálu sína synd...(?), en Gautr gerði þenna ok alla í Mǫn.

English translation:

 "Melbrigði, the son of  Aðakán the Smith, raised this cross for his sin ... soul, but Gautr made this and all in Man."

Br Olsen;215 (Kirk Michael (III), MM 130)

This is an old Irish stone cross that received an inscription in long branch runes, and it was probably by a Danish visitor in the 11th century. There are ogham inscriptions on both sides.

Latin transliteration:

 mal:lymkun : raisti : krus : þena : efter : mal:mury : fustra : si(n)e : tot(o)r : tufkals : kona : is : aþisl : ati + ¶ ...etra : es : laifa : fustra : kuþan : þan : son : ilan +

Old Norse transliteration:

  reisti kross þenna eptir  fóstra sín, dóttir Dufgals, kona er Aðísl átti. Betra er leifa fóstra góðan en son illan.

English translation:

(It) is better to leave a good foster-son than a wretched son."

Br Olsen;217A (Kirk Michael (IV), MM 126)

This is a stone cross that is found in the church Michael. The inscription with short-twig runes was made in the second half of the 11th century.

Latin transliteration:

 [k](r)i(m) : risti : krus : þna : ift : rum(u)... ...

Old Norse transliteration:

 Grímr reisti kross þenna ept Hróðmu[nd] ...

English translation:

 "Grímr raised this cross in memory of Hróðmundr ... his ..."

Br Olsen;217B (Kirk Michael (V), MM 132)

This is a stone cross that is located in the church Michael. The inscription in short-twig runes was made in the 980s by a runemaster named Thorbjörn.

Latin transliteration:

 + iualfir : sunr : þurulfs : hins : rauþa : ris(t)i : krus : þono : aft : friþu : muþur : sino +

Old Norse transliteration:

 , sonr Þórulfs hins Rauða, reisti kross þenna ept Fríðu, móður sína.

English translation:

 ", the son of Þórulfr the Red, raised this cross in memory of Fríða, his mother."

Br Olsen;218A (Kirk Michael (VI), MM 129)

This stone cross is located in the church Michael. It was engraved with short-twig runes in the second half of the 10th century.

Latin transliteration:

 ... (k)rims : ins : suarta ×

Old Norse transliteration:

 ... Gríms/...gríms hins Svarta.

English translation:

 "... (of) Grímr/-grímr the Black."

Br Olsen;218B (Kirk Michael (VII), MM 110)
This fragment of a stone cross is located in the church Kirk Michael. The inscription was made in short-twig runes between 930 and 950.

Latin transliteration:

 ... runar ...

Old Norse transliteration:

 ... rúnar ...

English translation:

 "... runes ..."

Br Olsen;219 (Kirk Michael (VIII), MM 123)
This fragment of a stone cross is located in the church Kirk Michael. The inscription was made during the Viking Age with short-twig runes.

Latin transliteration:

 ... : [ai](f)(t)(i)(r) * (m)(u)... * (u)...

Old Norse transliteration:

 ... eptir  ...

English translation:

 "... in memory of  ..."

See also
Picture stone

Notes

References

Barnes, M. P. (2012) 'The Manx Runes and the Supposed Jæren Connection', Futhark, 3, pp. 59-80
Cumming, J. G. (1857) The Runic and Other Monumental Remains of the Isle of Man
Hunter, John. Ralston, Ian (1999). The Archaeology of Britain: An Introduction. Routledge. 

 reprint of 1907 Bemrose ed.
Page, R. I. (1983) "The Manx Rune-stones", in Parsons, D. (ed). (1995). Runes and Runic Inscriptions. The Boydell Press, Woodbridge.

Orchard, Andy (1997). Dictionary of Norse Myth and Legend. Cassell. 
Rundata 2.0

Runestones by country
Runestones
Runstones
Runestones